German submarine U-453 was a Type VIIC U-boat built for Nazi Germany's Kriegsmarine for service during World War II.
She was laid down on 4 July 1940 by Deutsche Werke in Kiel as yard number 284, launched on 30 April 1941 and commissioned on 26 June 1941 under Kapitänleutnant Egon-Reiner von Schlippenbach (Knight's Cross).

The boat's service began on 26 June 1941 with training as part of the 7th U-boat Flotilla, followed by active service until being transferred to the 29th flotilla on 1 January 1942, based in La Spezia in Italy.

Design
German Type VIIC submarines were preceded by the shorter Type VIIB submarines. U-453 had a displacement of  when at the surface and  while submerged. She had two shafts and two  propellers.

U-453 was fitted with five  torpedo tubes (four fitted at the bow and one at the stern), fourteen torpedoes, one  SK C/35 naval gun, 220 rounds, and a  C/30 anti-aircraft gun. The boat had a complement of between forty-four and sixty.

Service history

Fate
She was depth charged and sunk by on 21 May 1944 off the south coast of Italy at position  by Royal Navy destroyers ,  and the escort destroyer .

Summary of raiding history

References

Notes

Citations

Bibliography

External links

German Type VIIC submarines
1941 ships
U-boats commissioned in 1941
U-boats sunk in 1944
U-boats sunk by British warships
U-boats sunk by depth charges
World War II submarines of Germany
World War II shipwrecks in the Mediterranean Sea
Ships built in Kiel
Maritime incidents in May 1944